Irania may refer to:
 Irania (bird), a genus of birds
 Irania (plant), a genus of plants in the family Brassicaceae

See also 
 Irania Encyclopedia
 Encyclopedia Iranica
 Iranian (disambiguation)